Autocunnilingus the act of oral stimulation of one's own vulva as a form of masturbation.

Documentation 
An unusually high degree of flexibility such as that of a contortionist would be required to perform the act. Unlike the male equivalent, autofellatio, which requires a less extreme frontbend and is known to be achievable by a small fraction of the male population, autocunnilingus has not been reliably documented. It has, however, been reported as a self-destructive fantasy, and occurrences have been reported in non-human primates.

Fiction 
In "Besorgung", one of his Venetian Epigrams, Goethe imagined Bettina becoming sufficiently limber to perform autocunnilingus and do without men. Camille Paglia compares the resulting image to William Blake's "engravings of solipsistically contorted figures".

References

Cunnilingus
Female masturbation